The Hounds of Notre Dame is a 1980 Canadian drama film directed by Zale Dalen.

Plot
The Hounds of Notre Dame is about 36 hours in the life of Père Athol Murray, a hard-drinking, chain-smoking Catholic priest, teacher, political activist and coach of the school hockey team, The Hounds. Peacocke gives a powerful performance as Murray, who defies his superior and gives anti-CCF (Co-operative Commonwealth Federation) speeches in 1940s Saskatchewan. The film received outstanding reviews and Peacocke won a Genie Award for best actor, but it received only limited distribution and came to symbolize the problems inherent in producing quality Canadian features.

Reception

 The film earned 9 Genie Award nominations in 1981 in the categories of:
 Best Performance by an Actor in a Leading Role - Thomas Peacocke (won)
 Best Achievement in Direction
 Best Achievement in Editing
 Best Achievement in Overall Sound
 Best Achievement in Sound Editing
 Best Motion Picture
 Best Performance by an Actor in a Supporting Role
 Best Performance by an Actress in a Supporting Role
 Best Original Screenplay

References

External links
 
 

1980 films
Canadian drama films
English-language Canadian films
Films directed by Zale Dalen
Canadian ice hockey films
1980s English-language films
1980s Canadian films